Arthur Andrew (1915–1994) is a Canadian diplomat.

Arthur Andrew may also refer to:

Arthur Lynch fitz Andrew, Mayor of Galway

See also

Arthur Andrews (disambiguation)